Calvary Morris Young (March 12, 1840 – July 11, 1909) was an American soldier who fought in the American Civil War. Young received his country's highest award for bravery during combat, the Medal of Honor. Young's medal was awarded for his gallantry during the capture of the Confederate States Army Brigadier General William Lewis Cabell during Price's Raid in Kansas at the Battle of Mine Creek on October 25, 1864. He was honored with the award on April 4, 1865.

Young was born in Washington County, Ohio, and entered service in Hopeville, Iowa. He was buried in Fort Mitchell, Kentucky.

Medal of Honor citation

See also
List of American Civil War Medal of Honor recipients: T–Z

References

1840 births
1909 deaths
American Civil War recipients of the Medal of Honor
People from Washington County, Ohio
People of Ohio in the American Civil War
People of Iowa in the American Civil War
Union Army soldiers
United States Army Medal of Honor recipients